Darrehrud District is in Ardabil province, Iran. Prior to the establishment of the county, the constituent parts of the district were in the former Angut District of Germi County. The district consists of two rural districts, and there are no cities. The center of the district is the village of Ziveh, with 1,412 people in 375 households at the census in 2016.

References 

Districts of Ardabil Province

Populated places in Ardabil Province

fa:بخش دره‌رود